The 1977 Mid Glamorgan County Council election was held in May 1977 and were the second elections to Mid Glamorgan County Council, electing 85 councillors. It was preceded by the 1973 election and followed by the 1981 election.

Ward Results

Aberdare No.1: Llwydcoed (two seats)

Aberdare No.2: Blaengwawr (one seat)

Aberdare No.3: Gadlys (one seat)

Aberdare No.4: Town (one seat)

Aberdare No.5: Aberaman (one seat)

Abertridwr and Senghennydd

Bedwas and Machen (two seats)

Bedwellty No.1 Aberbargoed (one seat)

Bedwellty No.2 Abertysswg (one seat)

Bridgend (two seats)
Alfred Bowen, who had represented Bridgend on the old Glamorgan County Council prior to re-organization, lost his seat to the Conservatives.

Caerphilly No.1 (one seat)

Caerphilly No.2 Llanbradach (one seat)

Caerphilly No.4 (one seat)
Lindsay Whittle unseated Bertie Rowland, who had represented Caerphilly on the former Glamorgan County Council.

Caerphilly No.5 North (one seat)

Caerphilly No.6 South (one seat)

Caerphilly No.7 (one seat)

Cardiff Rural (one seat)

Cowbridge Rural (one seat)

Dowlais (one seat)

Gelligaer No.1 (one seat)

Gelligaer No.2 (one seat)
Davies was elected as an Independent Labour candidate in 1973.

Gelligaer No.3 (one seat)

Gelligaer No.4 (two seats)

Llantrisant and Llantwitfardre No.1 (four seats)

Llantrisant and Llantwitfardre No.2 (two seats)

Maesteg No.1 (one seat)

Maesteg No.2 (one seat)

Maesteg No.3 (one seat)

Merthyr, Cyfarthfa (one seat)

Merthyr No.6 (one seat)

Merthyr No.7 (one seat)

Merthyr Park (two seats)

Merthyr Town (one seat)

Mountain Ash No.1 (one seat)

Mountain Ash No.2 (one seat)

Mountain Ash No.3 (two seats)

Ogmore and Garw No.1 (one seat)

Ogmore and Garw No.2 (two seats)

Penybont No.1 (one seat)

Penybont No.2 (one seat)

Penybont No.3 (one seat)

Penybont No.4 (one seat)

Penybont No.5 (two seats)

Penybont No.6 (two seats)

Penydarren (one seat)

Pontypridd No.1 (one seat)

Pontypridd No.2 Town (one seat)

Pontypridd No.3 (one seat)

Pontypridd No.4 Trallwn (one seat)

Pontypridd No.5 Rhydyfelin (one seat)

Pontypridd No.6 (one seat)

Porthcawl No.1 (one seat)

Porthcawl No.2 (one seat)

Rhondda No.1 Treherbert (two seats)

Rhondda No.2 Treorchy (two seats)

Rhondda No.3 Pentre (one seat)

Rhondda No.4 Ystrad (one seat)

Rhondda No.5 (one seat)

Rhondda No.6 (one seat)

Rhondda No.7 Penygraig (one seat)

Rhondda No.8 Porth (two seats)

Rhondda No.9 (one seat)

Rhymney Lower, Middle and Upper (one seat)

Treharris (one seat)

Vaynor and Penderyn No.1 (one seat)

Vaynor and Penderyn No.2 (one seat)

Sources

1977 Welsh local elections
1977